A  (: 'Yule; Christmas', : 'dawn') is a Swedish term for the matins on Christmas Day, 25 December, that celebrates the nativity of Jesus Christ.

Observance
The service is held every 25 December early on Christmas morning – at 7 a.m. in most church buildings, but in some churches it is celebrated at 10 a.m., or as early as 4 a.m. During previous centuries, most s were held at 4 a.m. Traditionally, the service should end before, or at the time of, dawn: hence the word  is the time just before dawn. After , Swedish people race to get home first from the church. The winner is believed to harvest the most bountiful crops for the year ahead. 

Historically in the Church of Sweden the clergy was obliged not only to say the high mass but also matins and evensong; today only the evensong of Christmas remain but has been liturgically changed since and can now be the main service of Christmas Day, wherefore many parishes have no mid-morning high mass on Christmas Day.

History
 was traditionally the most popular service in the Church of Sweden but the Midnight Mass on 24 December has become more popular. People who hardly attended church regularly in the rest of the year often attended the  but they tend to go to the Midnight Mass or the Advent Sunday service.

In 1979 5.35% of Church of Sweden members attended their parish church on Christmas Day, but by 1988, the number had decreased to 3.76%.

Swedish immigrants spread the festivity to different countries.

References

External links
Excerpt from a Julotta service held in Alabama, YouTube

Mass (liturgy)
Nativity of Jesus in worship and liturgy
Christmas in Sweden
Church of Sweden